In American politics, a superdelegate is an unpledged delegate to the Democratic National Convention who is seated automatically and chooses for themselves for whom they vote. These Democratic Party superdelegates (who make up slightly under 15% of all convention delegates) include party leaders and elected officials (PLEOs).

Democratic superdelegates are free to support any candidate for the presidential nomination. This contrasts with pledged delegates who are selected based on the party primaries and caucuses in each U.S. state, in which voters choose among candidates for the party's presidential nomination. On August 25, 2018, the Democratic National Committee agreed to reduce the influence of superdelegates by generally preventing them from voting on the first ballot at the Democratic National Convention, allowing their votes only in a contested nomination.

Superdelegates are not involved in the Republican Party nomination process. The state chairman and two district-level committee members from each state are automatically seated at the Republican National Convention, but they are mostly obliged to vote for their state's popular vote winner under the rules of the party branch to which they belong.

Although the term superdelegate was originally coined and created to describe a type of Democratic delegate, the term has become widely used to describe these delegates in both parties. However, it is not an official term used by either party.

Description 
Of all the delegates to the Democratic National Convention, slightly under 15% are superdelegates. According to the Pew Research Center, superdelegates are "the embodiment of the institutional Democratic Party – everyone from former presidents, congressional leaders and big-money fundraisers to mayors, labor leaders and longtime local party functionaries." For Democrats, superdelegates fall into four categories based on other positions they hold, and are formally described (in Rule 9.A) as "unpledged party leader and elected official delegates" (unpledged PLEO delegates) consisting of

 Elected members of the Democratic National Committee: "the chairs and vice chairs of each state and territorial Democratic Party; 212 national committeemen and committeewomen elected to represent their states; top officials of the DNC itself and several of its auxiliary groups (such as the Democratic Attorneys General Association, the National Federation of Democratic Women and the Young Democrats of America); and 75 at-large members who are nominated by the party chairman and chosen by the full DNC." Most of the at-large members "are local party leaders, officeholders and donors or representatives of important Democratic constituencies, such as organized labor." There were 437 DNC members (with 433 votes) who were superdelegates at the 2016 Democratic National Convention.
 Democratic governors (including territorial governors and the mayor of the District of Columbia). There were 21 Democratic governors who were superdelegates at the 2016 Democratic National Convention.
 Democratic members of Congress. There were 191 U.S. representatives (including non-voting delegates from Washington, D.C. and territories) and 47 U.S. senators (including Washington, D.C. shadow senators) who were superdelegates at the 2016 Democratic National Convention.
 Distinguished party leaders (consisting of current and former presidents, vice presidents, congressional leaders, and DNC chairs). There were 20 of these who were superdelegates at the 2016 Democratic National Convention.

Of the superdelegates at the 2016 Convention, 58% were male and 62% were non-Hispanic white (20% were black and 11% were Hispanic). The average age was about 60. There is no bar on lobbyists serving as DNC members (and thus superdelegates); ABC News found that about 9% of superdelegates at the 2016 Democratic National Convention (67 people in all) were former or current lobbyists registered on the federal and state level.

For Republicans, there are three delegates in each state, consisting of the state chairman and two Republican National Committee committee members, who are automatic delegates to the national convention. However, at the 2012 Republican National Convention, convention rules were amended to obligate these RNC members to vote according to the result of primary elections held in their states if the state holds a primary.

Comparison with pledged delegates 
Unpledged PLEO (party leaders and elected officials) delegates should not be confused with pledged PLEO delegates; Democratic Party rules distinguish pledged and unpledged delegates. Pledged delegates are selected based on their announced preferences in the contest for the presidential nomination. In the party primary elections and caucuses in each U.S. state, voters express their preference among the contenders for the party's nomination for President of the United States. Pledged delegates supporting each candidate are chosen in approximate ratio to their candidate's share of the vote. They fall into three categories: district-level pledged delegates (usually by congressional districts), at-large pledged delegates, and pledged PLEO delegates. In a minority of the states, delegates are legally required to support the candidate to whom they are pledged. In addition to the states' requirements, the party rules state (Rule 12.J): "Delegates elected to the national convention pledged to a presidential candidate shall in all good conscience reflect the sentiments of those who elected them."

By contrast, the unpledged PLEO delegates (Rule 9.A) are seated without regard to their presidential preferences, solely by virtue of being current or former elected officeholders and party officials. Many of them have chosen to announce endorsements, but they are not bound in any way. They may support any candidate they wish, including one who has dropped out of the presidential race.

Under Rule 9.C, the pledged PLEO slots are allocated to candidates based on the results of the primaries and caucuses. Another difference between pledged PLEOs and unpledged PLEOs is that there is a fixed number of pledged PLEO slots for each state, while the number of unpledged PLEOs can change during the campaign. Pledged PLEO delegates are not generally considered superdelegates.

Origins 
After the 1968 Democratic National Convention, at which pro-Vietnam War liberal Hubert Humphrey was nominated for the presidency despite not running in a single primary election, the Democratic Party made changes in its delegate selection process to correct what was seen as "illusory" control of the nomination process by primary voters. A commission headed by South Dakota senator George McGovern and Minnesota representative Donald M. Fraser met in 1969 and 1970 to make the composition of the Democratic Party's nominating convention less subject to control by party leaders and more responsive to the votes cast in primary elections.

The rules implemented by the McGovern-Fraser Commission shifted the balance of power to primary elections and caucuses, mandating that all delegates be chosen via mechanisms open to all party members. As a result of this change the number of primaries more than doubled over the next three presidential election cycles, from 17 in 1968 to 35 in 1980. Despite the radically increased level of primary participation, with 32 million voters taking part in the selection process by 1980, the Democrats proved largely unsuccessful at the ballot box, with the 1972 presidential campaign of McGovern and the 1980 re-election campaign of Jimmy Carter resulting in landslide defeats. Democratic Party affiliation skidded from 41 percent of the electorate at the time of the McGovern-Fraser Commission report to just 31 percent in the aftermath of the 1980 electoral debacle.

Further soul-searching took place among party leaders, who argued that the pendulum had swung too far in the direction of primary elections over insider decision-making, with one May 1981 California white paper declaring that the Democratic Party had "lost its leadership, collective vision and ties with the past," resulting in the nomination of unelectable candidates. A new 70-member commission headed by Governor of North Carolina Jim Hunt was appointed to further refine the Democratic Party's nomination process, attempting to balance the wishes of rank-and-file Democrats with the collective wisdom of party leaders and to thereby avoid the nomination of insurgent candidates exemplified by the liberal McGovern or the anti-Washington conservative Carter and lessening the potential influence of single-issue politics in the selection process.

Following a series of meetings held from August 1981 to February 1982, the Hunt Commission issued a report which recommended the setting aside of unelected and unpledged delegate slots for Democratic members of Congress and for state party chairs and vice chairs (so-called "superdelegates"). With the original Hunt plan, superdelegates were to represent 30% of all delegates to the national convention, but when it was finally implemented by the Democratic National Committee for the 1984 election, the number of superdelegates was set  Over time this percentage has gradually increased, until by 2008 the percentage stood at approximately 20% of total delegates to the Democratic Party nominating convention.

DNC Unity Reform Commission and superdelegate reform, 2016–2018
On July 23, 2016, ahead of the 2016 Democratic National Convention, the 2016 DNC Rules Committee voted overwhelmingly (158–6) to adopt a superdelegate reform package. The new rules were the result of a compromise between the Hillary Clinton and the Bernie Sanders presidential campaigns; in the past, Sanders had pressed for the complete elimination of superdelegates.

Under the reform package, in future Democratic Conventions, about two-thirds of superdelegates would be bound to the results of state primaries and caucuses. The remaining one-third—members of Congress, governors, and distinguished party leaders—would remain unpledged and free to support the candidate of their choice.

Under the reform package, a 21-member unity commission, chaired by Clinton supporter Jennifer O'Malley Dillon and vice-chaired by Sanders supporter Larry Cohen, was appointed after the 2016 general election. The commission's recommendations would be voted on at the next Democratic National Committee meeting, well before the beginning of the 2020 Democratic primaries. The commission was to consider "a mix of Clinton and Sanders ideas": expanding the ability of eligible voters to participate in caucuses (an idea supported by Clinton) and expanding the ability of unaffiliated or new voters to join the Democratic Party and vote in Democratic primaries via same-day registration and re-registration (an idea supported by Sanders). The commission drew comparisons to the McGovern–Fraser Commission, which established party primary reforms before the 1972 Democratic National Convention.

By April 2017, the complete committee had been appointed. In accordance with the compromise agreement, the 21 members include, in addition to O'Malley Dillon and Cohen; nine members selected by Clinton, seven selected by Sanders, and three selected by the DNC chair (Tom Perez). By May 2017, the DNC Unity Reform Commission had begun to meet to begin drafting reforms, including superdelegate reform as well as primary calendar and caucus reform.

In a series of meetings in the summer and fall of 2017, the Unity Commission "considered various proposals for dealing with superdelegates — including automatically binding their votes to their states' choice" but the issue of whether to abolish superdelegates altogether remained controversial within the party. In December 2017, the Unity Commission's recommendations  were delivered to the DNC Rules and Bylaws Committee. By December 7, both Perez and Deputy DNC Chair Keith Ellison co-authored an "op-ed" document for CNN, stating they intended to make "a "significant reduction" of the number of superdelegates who vote to decide the party's nominee for president". Ultimately, the DNC decided to prevent superdelegates from voting on the first ballot, instead of reducing their numbers.

Superdelegates in practice

1984 election

In 1984, only state party chairs and vice chairs were guaranteed superdelegate status. The remaining spots were divided two ways. Democratic members of Congress were allowed to select up to 60% of their members to fill some of these spots. The remaining positions were left to the state parties to fill with priority given to governors and big-city mayors, led by Democrats and based on population.

In the 1984 election, the major contenders for the presidential nomination were Gary Hart, Jesse Jackson, and Walter Mondale. Entering the final handful of primaries on June 5, Mondale was leading Hart in the delegate count, with Jackson far behind. The battle for delegates became more dramatic that night when Hart won three primaries, including the big prize of California in a cliffhanger. The Mondale campaign said, and some news reports agreed, that Mondale secured the needed 1,967 delegates to clinch the nomination that night in spite of losing California. But the Associated Press concluded he was "barely short of the magic majority." Mondale wanted to make it indisputable that he had enough delegate votes, and his campaign set a deadline of one minute before noon; he made 50 calls in three hours to nail down an additional 40 superdelegates and declared at a press conference that he had 2,008 delegate votes. At the convention in July, Mondale won on the first ballot.

1988 election

In 1988, this process was simplified. Democrats in Congress were now allowed to select up to 80% of their members. All Democratic National Committee members and all Democratic governors were given superdelegate status. This year also saw the addition of the distinguished party leader category (although former DNC chairs were not added to this category until 1996, and former House and Senate minority leaders were not added until 2000). In 1992 was the addition of a category of unpledged "add-ons", a fixed number of spots allocated to the states, intended for other party leaders and elected officials not already covered by the previous categories. Finally, beginning in 1996, all Democratic members of Congress were given superdelegate status.

The superdelegates have not always prevailed, however. In the Democratic primary phase of the 2004 election, Howard Dean acquired an early lead in delegate counts by obtaining the support of a number of superdelegates before even the first primaries were held. Nevertheless, John Kerry defeated Dean in a succession of primaries and caucuses and won the nomination.

In 1988, a study found that superdelegates and delegates selected through the primary and caucus process are not substantively different in terms of viewpoints on issues from each other. However, superdelegates are more likely to prefer candidates with Washington experience than outsider candidates.

2008 election

At the 2008 Democratic National Convention, the superdelegates made up approximately one-fifth of the total number of delegates. The closeness of the race between the leading contenders, Hillary Clinton and Barack Obama, led to speculation that the superdelegates would play a decisive role in selecting the nominee, a prospect that caused unease among some Democratic Party leaders. Obama led in pledged delegates at the end of voting in the state contests while not winning enough to secure the nomination without the superdelegates  and he received enough superdelegate endorsements shortly thereafter that Hillary agreed to end her campaign before the superdelegates voted at the convention even though Hillary had enough delegates that the superdelegates could have made either candidate the nominee at the convention.

At the 2008 Democratic National Convention, superdelegates cast approximately 823.5 votes, with fractions arising because superdelegates from Michigan, Florida, and Democrats Abroad are entitled to half a vote each. Of the superdelegates' votes, 745 were from unpledged PLEO delegates and 78.5 were from unpledged add-on delegates.

There was no fixed number of unpledged PLEO delegates. The number was allowed to change during the campaign as particular individuals gained or lost qualification under a particular category. The unpledged PLEO delegates were: all Democratic members of the United States Congress, Democratic governors, members of the Democratic National Committee, "[a]ll former Democratic presidents, all former Democratic vice presidents, all former Democratic leaders of the U.S. Senate, all former Democratic speakers of the U.S. House of Representatives and Democratic minority leaders, as applicable, and all former chairs of the Democratic National Committee."

There was an exception, however, for otherwise qualified individuals who endorse another party's candidate for President; under Rule 9.A, they lose their superdelegate status. In 2008, Senator Joe Lieberman of Connecticut endorsed Republican John McCain, which, according to the chairwoman of the Connecticut Democratic Party, resulted in his disqualification as a superdelegate. Lieberman's status had, however, previously been questioned because, although he was a registered Democratic voter and caucused with the Democrats, he won re-election as the candidate of the Connecticut for Lieberman Party and was listed as an "Independent Democrat". The count for Connecticut's delegates in the state party's delegate selection plan, issued before his endorsement of McCain, reportedly excluded Lieberman, and he was not included on at least one list of PLEO delegates prepared before his endorsement. In the end, he was not a superdelegate and did not attend the Democratic Convention; he was instead a speaker at the Republican Convention.

The unpledged add-on delegate slots for the various states totaled 81, but the initial rule had been that the five unpledged add-on delegates from Michigan and Florida would not be seated, leaving 76 unpledged add-on delegates. Michigan and Florida were being penalized for violating Democratic Party rules by holding their primaries too early.

The exact number of superdelegates changed several times because of events. For example, the number decreased as a result of the death of Representative Tom Lantos, the move from Maine to Florida of former Maine governor Kenneth M. Curtis, and the resignation of New York Governor Eliot Spitzer. (Because New York's new governor, David Paterson, was an at-large member of the Democratic National Committee, he was already a superdelegate before becoming governor.) On the other hand, the number increased when special elections for the House of Representatives were won by Democrats Bill Foster, André Carson, Jackie Speier, and Travis Childers.

The biggest change came on May 31 as a result of the meeting of the national party's Rules and Bylaws Committee, which lessened the penalty initially imposed on Michigan and Florida. The party had excluded all delegates (including superdelegates) from either state. The Rules and Bylaws Committee voted to seat all these superdelegates (as well as the pledged delegates from those states) but with half a vote each. That action added 55 superdelegates with 27.5 votes. The total number of superdelegates could continue to change until the beginning of the convention (Call to the Convention Section IV(C)(2)). On August 24, the Democratic Party, at the request of Obama, awarded delegates from Michigan and Florida full voting rights.

Pledged delegates from state caucuses and primaries eventually numbered 3,573, casting 3,566 votes, resulting in a total number of delegate votes of 4,419. A candidate needed a majority of that total, or 2,209, to win the nomination. Superdelegates accounted for approximately one fifth (19.6%) of all votes at the convention and delegates chosen in the Democratic caucuses and primaries accounted for approximately four-fifths (80.4%) of the Democratic convention delegates. At the convention, Obama won 3,188.5 delegate votes and Hillary Clinton won 1,010.5 with 1 abstention and 218 delegates not voting.

Politico found that about half of the superdelegates were white men, compared to 28% of the Democratic primary electorate.

In the Republican Party, as in the Democratic Party, members of the party's national committee automatically become delegates. There are three Republican National Committee delegates (the national committeeman, national committeewoman, and state party chair) for each state. In the 2008 Republican National Convention, 123 RNC delegates among the 2,380 total delegates were not pledged to any candidate.

2016 election

On February 12, 2016, Debbie Wasserman Schultz, chair of the Democratic National Committee, was asked by CNN's Jake Tapper, "What do you tell voters who are new to the process who say this makes them feel like it's all rigged?" Schultz's response was, "Unpledged delegates exist really to make sure that party leaders and elected officials don't have to be in a position where they are running against grass-roots activists . . . And so we separate out those unpledged delegates to make sure that there isn't competition between them." This statement was hailed by Clinton supporters as a wise policy to maintain steady, experienced governance, and derided by Bernie Sanders' supporters as the establishment thwarting the will of the people.

Several mainstream media outlets included superdelegates in the candidate delegate totals during the primary elections although superdelegates do not actually vote until the Democratic convention and may change their minds on whom they are planning to vote for anytime before the convention. The Democratic National Committee eventually publicly instructed media outlets to not include them in primary delegate totals. Nevertheless, many outlets, including the Associated Press, NBC, CBS, and Politico, continued to report the candidate delegate totals by lumping the superdelegates into the totals, inflating Hillary Clinton's lead by over 400 delegates. Critics alleged that this created a perception of insurmountability and that it was done in order to discourage would-be Sanders supporters.

2020 election

This was the first election with the 2016–2018 superdelegate reform measures. Under these rules, superdelegates cannot vote on the first presidential nominating ballot, unless a candidate via the outcome of primaries and caucuses already has gained enough votes (more than 50% of all delegate votes) among only the elected pledged delegates. Superdelegates may vote in subsequent ballots when it becomes a contested convention in which the pledged delegate vote alone is insufficient to determine the nominee. This does not preclude superdelegates from publicly endorsing a candidate of their choosing before the convention.

Criticism 
Susan Estrich argued that these delegates would have more power than other delegates because of their greater freedom to vote as they wish beginning with the first ballot.

Delegates chosen in primaries and caucuses do not precisely reflect the votes cast, but Democratic Party rules require proportional allocation of delegates rather than the plurality winner of a state primary or caucus taking all of the delegates ('winner-take-all').

Criticism against the Democratic Party's use of superdelegates also came in November 2017 from Tim Kaine, Hillary Clinton's former running mate in the 2016 U.S. national election and the junior U.S. senator from Virginia. On November 15, 2017, Kaine stated that he had sent a letter to Tom Perez, the current DNC Chairman, criticizing the use of the superdelegate system; in general agreement with the junior U.S. senator from Vermont and 2016 Democratic primary challenger Bernie Sanders, with Kaine stating that "I have long believed there should be no superdelegates. These positions are given undue influence in the popular nominating contest and make the process less democratic."

References

Notes

External links 

 "Delegate Selection Rules for the 2008 Democratic National Convention" - official Democratic Party rules (note: this is a redirect from the link www.democrats.org/page/-/dem_convention/rules.pdf, on https://web.archive.org/web/20080213002439/http://www.demconvention.com/how-to-become-a-delegate/)

United States presidential nominating conventions
Organizational structure of political parties